= Qarasuran =

The Qarasuran (Turkic: قره سوران/قراسوران) were the gendarmerie corps and provincial security administration of the Safavid dynasty and Qajar dynasty during the Safavid and Qajar eras of Iran, respectively. The majority of Qarasuran members were involved in the protection and safety of main roads.
